Mattiel is an Atlanta-based band fronted by Mattiel Brown and produced by Jonah Swilley. They have released three albums, Mattiel in 2017, Satis Factory in 2019 and Georgia Gothic in March 2022, alongside two EPs: Double Cover (2020) and Those Words (2021). All releases came out on the British record label Heavenly Recordings in the UK and Europe and on ATO Records for the US (except for Mattiel, which was released by Burger Records in the US).

The band has been championed by Jack White, who took them out on arena shows around the US. Rolling Stone compared Brown’s “gorgeously yearning, full-voiced alto range” to Nico, while NPR wrote: “There's something delightfully unique about Mattiel's music. A pinch of garage rock, a touch of psychedelia, some galloping honky-tonk and at the lead, Mattiel Brown's powerful and assertive vocals.”

Sophomore album Satis Factory received four-star reviews from The Guardian, Q, Mojo, DIY, Uncut, and The Times, and was named Album of the Weekend by BBC Radio 1 Hype Chart and A-listed as Album of the Day on BBC Radio 6 Music. Mattiel were also listed as WXPN Artist of the Month.

In addition, Mattiel have also performed on Later... with Jools Holland and Last Call with Carson Daly, and featured in The BBC Proms at the Royal Albert Hall, London. Most of their performances are posted on their YouTube channel, as well as their southern gothic style music videos, the newest of which for the song Blood in the Yolk was inspired by 1970s middle eastern gothic styles.

Discography

Studio albums 
 Mattiel (2017)
 Satis Factory (2019)
 Georgia Gothic (2022)

Extended plays 
 Double Cover (2020)
 Those Words (2021)

References 

American women singer-songwriters
Heavenly Recordings artists
ATO Records artists
Singer-songwriters from Georgia (U.S. state)